Blanton may refer to:

People with the surname 
Aaron Blanton, American producer/director
Brett Blanton, 12th Architect of the Capitol
Carsie Blanton, American singer-songwriter
Elizabeth Blanton, American astronomer
Jack C.F. Blanton, American politician
Joe Blanton, American baseball pitcher
Jimmy Blanton, American jazz double bassist
Kendall Blanton, American football player
Kirby Bliss Blanton, American actress.
Ray Blanton, American politician
Vince Blanton, American businessman and entrepreneur 
Virginia Blanton, American professor
Ward Blanton, British scholar
William W. Blanton, American politician

People with the given-name 

 Blanton Duncan (1827–1902), American landholder, printer, political organizer, and Confederate Army officer
 Blanton Winship (1869–1947), American military lawyer and veteran

Places 

Blanton, Georgia
Blanton, Oklahoma
Blanton Museum of Art

See also
Blanton's
Blanton v. City of North Las Vegas

Surnames
Given names
Surnames of British Isles origin
English-language surnames
Surnames of English origin